John Pomfret may refer to:

John Pomfret (poet) (1667–1702), English poet and clergyman
John Pomfret (journalist) (born 1959), American journalist and writer
John Edwin Pomfret (1898–1981), American academic